Sir Alfred Charles Bernard Lovell  (31 August 19136 August 2012) was an English physicist and radio astronomer. He was the first director of Jodrell Bank Observatory, from 1945 to 1980.

Early life and education
Lovell was born at Oldland Common, Bristol in 1913, the son of local tradesman and Methodist preacher Gilbert Lovell (1881-1956) and Emily Laura, née Adams. Gilbert Lovell was an "authority on the Bible" and, having "studied English literature and grammar", was still "bombarding his son with complaints on points of grammar, punctuation and method of speaking" when Lovell was in his forties. Lovell's childhood hobbies and interests included cricket and music, mainly the piano. He had a Methodist upbringing and attended Kingswood Grammar School.

Career and research 
Lovell studied physics at the University of Bristol obtaining a Bachelor of Science degree in 1934, and a PhD in 1936 for his work on the electrical conductivity of thin films. At this time, he also received lessons in music from Raymond Jones, a teacher at Bath Technical School and later an organist at Bath Abbey. The church organ was one of the main loves of his life, apart from science.

Lovell worked in the cosmic ray research team at the University of Manchester until the outbreak of the Second World War. At the beginning of the war, Lovell published his first book, Science and Civilization. During the war he worked for the Telecommunications Research Establishment (TRE) developing radar systems to be installed in aircraft, among them H2S. In June 1942 he was involved in the recovery of a highly secret cavity magnetron from the wreckage of a Handley Page Halifax that had crashed killing a number of his colleagues, including EMI engineer Alan Blumlein, while on a test flight.

At the end of the Second World War, Lovell attempted to continue his studies of cosmic rays with an ex-military radar detector unit, but suffered much background interference from the electric trams on Manchester's Oxford Road. He moved his equipment to a more remote location, one which was free from such electrical interference, and where he established the Jodrell Bank Observatory, near Goostrey in Cheshire. It was an outpost of the university's botany department and had been a searchlight station during the war. In the course of his experiments, he was able to show that radar echoes could be obtained from daytime meteor showers as they entered the Earth's atmosphere and ionised the surrounding air. He was later able to determine the orbits of meteors in annual meteor showers to show they were in solar orbit and not of interstellar origin. With university funding, he constructed the then-largest steerable radio telescope in the world, which now bears his name: the Lovell Telescope. Over 50 years later, it remains a productive radio telescope, now operated mostly as part of the MERLIN and European VLBI Network interferometric arrays of radio telescopes.

In 2009, Lovell claimed he had been the subject of a Cold War assassination attempt during a 1963 visit to the Soviet Deep-Space Communication Centre (Eupatoria). Lovell alleged that his hosts tried to kill him with a lethal radiation dose because he was head of the Jodrell Bank space telescope when it was also being used as part of an early warning system for Soviet nuclear attacks. Lovell wrote a full account of the incident which, at his determination, was only published after his death.

Lectures
In 1958, Lovell was invited by the BBC to deliver the annual Reith Lectures, a series of six radio broadcasts called The Individual and the Universe, in which he examined the history of enquiry into the solar system and the origin of the universe.

In 1959, he was invited to deliver the MacMillan Memorial Lecture to the Institution of Engineers and Shipbuilders in Scotland. He chose the subject "Radio Astronomy and the Structure of the Universe".

In 1965 he was invited to co-deliver the Royal Institution Christmas Lecture on Exploration of the Universe.

In 1975 he gave the presidential address (In the Centre of Immensities) to the British Association meeting in Guildford.

Awards and honours
Lovell won numerous awards including:

 1946 – Officer of the Order of the British Empire (OBE), for his work on H2S
1955 – Elected a Fellow of the Royal Society
 1955 – Elected to the American Academy of Arts and Sciences
 1960 – Royal Medal
 1961 – Knight Bachelor for his important contributions to the development of radio astronomy
 1967 – Honorary Degree (Doctor of Science), University of Bath
 1969 – Lorimer Medal of the Astronomical Society of Edinburgh
 1969–71 – President of the Royal Astronomical Society
 1974 – Elected to the American Philosophical Society
 1980 – Benjamin Franklin Medal
 1981 – Gold Medal of the Royal Astronomical Society

Lovell was a member of the Royal Swedish Academy of Sciences.

Beyond professional recognition, Lovell has a secondary school named after him in Oldland Common, Bristol, which he officially opened. A building on the QinetiQ site in Malvern is also named after him, as was the fictional scientist Bernard Quatermass, the hero of several BBC Television science-fiction serials of the 1950s, whose first name was chosen in honour of Lovell.

Personal life
In 1937, Lovell married Mary Joyce Chesterman (d. 1993) and they had two sons and three daughters. Their son Dr Bryan Lovell is a geologist at the University of Cambridge.

In later life Lovell was physically very frail; he lived in quiet retirement in the English countryside, surrounded by music, his books and a vast garden filled with trees he himself planted many decades before. Lovell died at home in Swettenham, Cheshire on 6 August 2012.

References

External links
 
 

1913 births
Jodrell Bank Observatory
20th-century British astronomers
Knights Bachelor
English physicists
Radio astronomers
Fellows of the Royal Society
Members of the Royal Swedish Academy of Sciences
Officers of the Order of the British Empire
Alumni of the University of Bristol
Radar pioneers
People from Bitton
People associated with Malvern, Worcestershire
Academics of the Victoria University of Manchester
Royal Medal winners
Recipients of the Gold Medal of the Royal Astronomical Society
2012 deaths
Presidents of the Royal Astronomical Society
People educated at King's Oak Academy
Recipients of the Dalton Medal
Members of the American Philosophical Society